Alican is the name of the Turkish border crossing point in Iğdır Province on the closed border of Turkey and Armenia. Alican is located on the other side of Margara.

History
In 2023, the border crossing briefly reopened to allow the passage of humanitarian aid following the Turkey–Syria earthquake for the first time since 1988.

References 

Armenia–Turkey border crossings
Geography of Iğdır Province